Lars Kindgen (born 25 November 1971) is a German professional footballer who played as a midfielder for Holstein Kiel and VfB Lübeck. He is also currently the executive director of the Vereinigung der Vertragsfußballspieler professional football players union in Germany.

Information 

He played for a variety of clubs over 13 years, and played at various positions at times including as a striker and a midfielder, though he preferred to play as a midfielder. He often cites his graudation from a youth player to a second division player at Wuppertaler SV to be the highlight of his career.

He last played for Borussia Lübeck, where he was both a player and branch manager. During this time, he opened up his own sports agency. He started working with the Vereinigung der Vertragsfußballspieler in 2005 and because the managing director of marketing at the Vereinigung der Vertragsfußballspieler, where he later became the executive director. He was involved in setting up up a working relationship with the VDV and the FIFPro in 2016.As part of his duties, Kingden has met with various players unions and has helped to build a players union for players from Ghana and handles issues involving holding training camps for free agent players, player rights, doping and mental health.
Kingden also often makes appearances as a figurehead for various VDV award ceremonies and is often interviewed about various German soccer ongoings.

Kidgen's activities are not limited to soccer, as Kingden has also been involved in issues related to German golf.

Personal Life 

Kindgen is married.

References

1971 births
Living people
German footballers
VfB Lübeck players
Association football midfielders
Wuppertaler SV players
VfL Osnabrück players
SV Wilhelmshaven players
Rot-Weiss Essen players